Maja Milinković (born 21 April 1981) is a Bosnian fado singer and songwriter, born in Sarajevo, the capital of SR Bosnia and Herzegovina (formerly a part of SFR Yugoslavia).

Milinković became known to a wide public in Bosnia and Herzegovina and other parts of Southeast Europe in 2003, as one of the 6 finalists of the first OBN Music Talent Show, the popular television show in Bosnia and Herzegovina.

She began singing at an early age in a church choir during the Bosnian War, and learn to play guitar in a shelter. She started to sing in a rock band when she was 15. Her grandfather and grandmother encouraged her to sing.  She graduated from the department of Music Theory and pedagogy at Music Academy of Sarajevo. She plays piano and guitar and works as a singer, songwriter, composer and music arranger. At 2009 she discovered the fado genre, and since then she has dedicated her life and work to it. Since 2013 she lives in Lisbon, Portugal.

Music career 
Milinković became widely known in Bosnia and Herzegovina and other parts of the Balkan Peninsula in 2003, as she was one of the six finalists of the first OBN Music Talent Show. After the show Maja recorded her first solo pop-rock album "Zacarani krug"  in the Hayat production label. The album won eleven 11 awards, including a Davorin for the best female interpretation. The song "Zovem Te" won 3 awards (interpretation, audience and arrangement)  on the "Bihacki festival". The song "Genijalno"  won first place for interpretation of the "Expert’s Jury”,"I BHRTV festival".

In 2011 she released her second solo pop-rock album "Očekivanja" 

She discovered fado in 2009, through the voice of Portuguese fado leading singer Amália Rodrigues, and she started to do research on that genre. She also started to learn Portuguese. In 2012 she recorded the first fado album in Bosnia and Herzegovina, the well known fado "Tudo isto é fado" which Amalia Rodrigues recorded at 1955, and since then has focussed on fado. During 2012, she had a dozen fado concerts in Bosnia and Herzegovina. Among them a concert at the most known music festival “Baščaršijske noći" (Baščaršija Nights) in Sarajevo, where she accomplished a success, and the acceptance of fado music by the people of her country. At the end of 2012, she performed a glamorous concert at the Sarajevo Chamber Theater. She was noted for her charismatic, powerful and strong emotional interpretation. 

Milinković moved to Portugal in 2013 where she currently lives.
2015. release single "Znam za rijeku", the first fado on Balkan Slavic languages.
2016. release single "Sou a chuva" .

In 2017, she released the fado album "Fado é sorte" at the Museu do Fado, in Lisbon. In 2019, she released the fado - sevdah album "Fadolinka"

Concerts
Solo concert in Lisbon in the Jerónimos Monastery in March 2017.,  solo concert "Fado je sevdah"  at the Bosnian Cultural Center in Sarajevo at the music festival “Baščaršijske noći" (Baščaršija Nights), in 2017, concerts in Teatro Ibérico, Auditório Camões, Zenica Summer festival, Konjic Summer festival, Chamber theater 55, National Multicultural festival in Canberra 2020  are just some of the venues from the long list of Maja's concerts.

Discography

Albums
2006 - Začarani krug CD
2011 - Očekivanja CD
2012 - Expectations CD
2013 - Fado Meu Maja live CD
2017 - Fado é sorte CD
2019 - Fadolinka CD 
2021 - Kaftan d' Alma

Singles
2007 - "Mito bekrijo"
2008 - "Kraj"
2009 - "Ako te ne budem imala"
2012 - "Tudo isto é fado"
2013 - "Trago fados nos sentidos"
2015 - "Znam za rijeku"
2016 - "Sou a chuva"
2018 - "Romansa- Uspavanka za dušu"
2018 - "Não há fado sem saudade" 
2022 - "Sarajevo u duši mi spavaš" 
2022 - "Não há fado sem saudade (remix)"

References

1981 births
Living people
Bosnia and Herzegovina fado singers
21st-century Bosnia and Herzegovina women singers
Portuguese-language singers